Bloomery is the name of several unincorporated communities in the U.S. state of West Virginia. Bloomery in Hampshire County has a post office in operation using this name. 

Bloomery, Hampshire County, West Virginia
Bloomery, Jefferson County, West Virginia